Mark Lowen is a British journalist. He is the BBC News Southern Europe correspondent, based in Rome. He was previously based in Turkey, Greece and Serbia. He moved to Rome in 2019 and is often deployed elsewhere on major stories.

Education
Lowen was educated at Sheen Mount Primary School in Richmond upon Thames from which he was awarded a Scholarship in 1994 to King's College School, an independent school for boys in  Wimbledon, followed by Balliol College at the University of Oxford,
where he obtained a First Class degree in History and French.

Life and career
Lowen joined the BBC's Paris bureau in 2005 as an intern, becoming a producer, followed by the BBC World Service in London in 2007 and BBC World News in 2008. He became the BBC Balkans correspondent based in Belgrade in 2009, covering the former republics of Yugoslavia and Albania, during which time he reported on the first elections in Kosovo since independence, the trial of Radovan Karadžić, and the arrest of the former Commander-in-Chief of the Bosnian Serb Army, Ratko Mladić.

Lowen became BBC Athens correspondent in autumn 2011, replacing Malcolm Brabant, who had become seriously ill following a routine inoculation against yellow fever. He covered Greece's financial crisis before moving to Istanbul in 2014. From there, he reported among other subjects on terror attacks, the attempted coup, the migrant crisis, the government of Recep Tayyip Erdoğan and the Syrian Civil War.

Family
Lowen's mother is the British actress Eve Karpf and his grandmother was Natalia Karp, née Weissman (1911-2007), a Jewish refugee from the Nazis and Holocaust survivor, whose story he told in a BBC broadcast and online report. Lowen is married to the Portuguese actor and director of the D. Maria II National Theatre Pedro Penim. In December 2022, Penim announced that he and Lowen had a daughter, born via surrogacy in Canada.

References

External links

BBC News - Mark Lowen articles

Alumni of Balliol College, Oxford
BBC newsreaders and journalists
English male journalists
English television journalists
Living people
People educated at King's College School, London
Year of birth missing (living people)
British LGBT journalists